Zaw Zaw Aung (1937–2016) was a Burmese author, critic and public intellectual, best known for introducing the concepts of modernism and post-modernism to Burmese readers. He was born in Monywa, and attended Mandalay University. He earned a master's degree from Rangoon University and later taught there. Aung died in Rangoon on January 26, 2016.

References

Burmese writers
1937 births
2016 deaths
University of Yangon alumni
Academic staff of the University of Yangon
People from Sagaing Region
Mandalay University alumni